Sinéad Crowley (born 1974) is an Irish journalist and novelist. She is Arts and Media Correspondent for RTÉ News and is a lecturer in journalism at Dublin City University. She has published three crime novels, Can Anybody Help Me? (2014), Are You Watching Me? (2015) and One Bad Turn (2017) in the novel series DS Claire Boyle.

Career
Crowley began her career as a journalist and film reviewer for the Northside People and later worked on the radio stations, Raidió Na Life, Clare FM and Radio Kerry. She joined Raidió Teilifís Éireann in 1997 as a reporter in Irish language programmes and joined the RTÉ Newsroom as a journalist in August 1999. Since December 2006, Crowley is Arts and Media Correspondent for RTÉ News and Current Affairs on television, radio and online. Since September 2019, she is a lecturer in journalism at Dublin City University. Crowley was on secondment to COVID-19 coverage on the One O'Clock News, Six One News and the Nine O'Clock News when the pandemic arrived in Ireland.

Personal life
Crowley is a fluent Irish speaker from Walkinstown in Dublin. She attended Dublin City University and University College Dublin and received a bachelor's degree in communication and media studies. She also received a master's degree in women's studies. Crowley is married to Andrew Phelan, who works for the Irish Independent, and has two sons.

Awards and nominations
Crowley has published three crime novels, Can Anybody Help Me? (2014), Are You Watching Me? (2015) and One Bad Turn (2017) in the novel series DS Claire Boyle. All three novels were shortlisted for the Irish Book Awards. She is now working on her fourth novel.

References

Living people
RTÉ newsreaders and journalists
Alumni of University College Dublin
Alumni of Dublin City University
Irish novelists
Irish women novelists
Irish women radio presenters
Irish journalists
Irish women journalists
1974 births